Aniołka-Parcele  is a settlement in the administrative district of Gmina Trzcinica, within Kępno County, Greater Poland Voivodeship in west-central Poland.

References

Villages in Kępno County